Akkens motorcycles were manufactured in England between 1919 and 1922, and featured 292cc Union two-stroke engines with deflector-type pistons.

References

Motorcycle manufacturers of the United Kingdom
Goods manufactured in England
Vehicles introduced in 1919
1919 establishments in England